Moscow City Duma District 18 is one of 45 constituencies in Moscow City Duma. The constituency has covered parts of Eastern Moscow since 2014. From 1993-2005 District 18 was based in South-Eastern Moscow; however, after the number of constituencies was reduced to 15 in 2005, the constituency was eliminated.

Members elected

Election results

2001

|-
! colspan=2 style="background-color:#E9E9E9;text-align:left;vertical-align:top;" |Candidate
! style="background-color:#E9E9E9;text-align:left;vertical-align:top;" |Party
! style="background-color:#E9E9E9;text-align:right;" |Votes
! style="background-color:#E9E9E9;text-align:right;" |%
|-
|style="background-color:"|
|align=left|Gennady Lobok
|align=left|Independent
|
|46.13%
|-
|style="background-color:"|
|align=left|Vladimir Kostyuchenko
|align=left|Independent
|
|25.50%
|-
|style="background-color:"|
|align=left|Mikhail Ilyin
|align=left|Independent
|
|9.82%
|-
|style="background-color:#000000"|
|colspan=2 |against all
|
|13.94%
|-
| colspan="5" style="background-color:#E9E9E9;"|
|- style="font-weight:bold"
| colspan="3" style="text-align:left;" | Total
| 
| 100%
|-
| colspan="5" style="background-color:#E9E9E9;"|
|- style="font-weight:bold"
| colspan="4" |Source:
|
|}

2014

|-
! colspan=2 style="background-color:#E9E9E9;text-align:left;vertical-align:top;" |Candidate
! style="background-color:#E9E9E9;text-align:left;vertical-align:top;" |Party
! style="background-color:#E9E9E9;text-align:right;" |Votes
! style="background-color:#E9E9E9;text-align:right;" |%
|-
|style="background-color:"|
|align=left|Irina Nazarova
|align=left|Independent
|
|40.85%
|-
|style="background-color:"|
|align=left|Margarita Chukanova
|align=left|Communist Party
|
|29.88%
|-
|style="background-color:"|
|align=left|Semyon Burd
|align=left|Yabloko
|
|10.02%
|-
|style="background-color:"|
|align=left|Andrey Kireyev
|align=left|Liberal Democratic Party
|
|6.21%
|-
|style="background-color:"|
|align=left|Vladimir Pogorelov
|align=left|Independent
|
|4.37%
|-
|style="background-color:"|
|align=left|Galina Babykina
|align=left|Independent
|
|3.76%
|-
|style="background-color:"|
|align=left|Aigul Makhmutova
|align=left|A Just Russia
|
|1.92%
|-
| colspan="5" style="background-color:#E9E9E9;"|
|- style="font-weight:bold"
| colspan="3" style="text-align:left;" | Total
| 
| 100%
|-
| colspan="5" style="background-color:#E9E9E9;"|
|- style="font-weight:bold"
| colspan="4" |Source:
|
|}

2019

|-
! colspan=2 style="background-color:#E9E9E9;text-align:left;vertical-align:top;" |Candidate
! style="background-color:#E9E9E9;text-align:left;vertical-align:top;" |Party
! style="background-color:#E9E9E9;text-align:right;" |Votes
! style="background-color:#E9E9E9;text-align:right;" |%
|-
|style="background-color:"|
|align=left|Yelena Yanchuk
|align=left|Communist Party
|
|42.16%
|-
|style="background-color:"|
|align=left|Nikolay Tabashnikov
|align=left|Independent
|
|23.19%
|-
|style="background-color:"|
|align=left|Anton Medvedev
|align=left|Liberal Democratic Party
|
|12.80%
|-
|style="background-color:"|
|align=left|Marya Marusenko
|align=left|Independent
|
|12.49%
|-
|style="background-color:"|
|align=left|Darya Shestakova
|align=left|A Just Russia
|
|5.29%
|-
| colspan="5" style="background-color:#E9E9E9;"|
|- style="font-weight:bold"
| colspan="3" style="text-align:left;" | Total
| 
| 100%
|-
| colspan="5" style="background-color:#E9E9E9;"|
|- style="font-weight:bold"
| colspan="4" |Source:
|
|}

Notes

References

Moscow City Duma districts